The canton of Pont-sur-Yonne is an administrative division of the Yonne department, central France. Its borders were modified at the French canton reorganisation which came into effect in March 2015. Its seat is in Pont-sur-Yonne.

It consists of the following communes:
 
Champigny
Chaumont
Courtois-sur-Yonne
Pont-sur-Yonne
Saint-Sérotin
Villeblevin
Villemanoche
Villenavotte
Villeneuve-la-Guyard
Villeperrot

References

Cantons of Yonne